Mordechai Drory (born 1931, Jerusalem) is a former Israeli diplomat having retired in 1996.

In the past he was Israeli ambassador to Italy, Benin, Belgium and the European Union. He has also been the Consul General in Marseilles, France.

Drory studied at the Paris-Sorbonne University and earned a PhD in Political Science and History from the Hebrew University of Jerusalem. He is married to Florence Pavaux-Drory, a former aide to François Mitterrand.

References 

1931 births
People from Jerusalem
Ambassadors of Israel to the European Union
Ambassadors of Israel to Italy
Ambassadors of Israel to Belgium
Ambassadors of Israel to Benin
Paris-Sorbonne University alumni
Hebrew University of Jerusalem alumni
Israeli consuls
Living people